Allodia is a genus of flies belonging to the family Mycetophilidae.

The genus was described in 1863 by Winnertz.

The genus has cosmopolitan distribution.

Selected species:
 Allodia ablata Zaitzev, 1984
 Allodia actuaria Johannsen, 1912
 Allodia aculeata Zaitzev, 1984
 Allodia adunca Zaitzev, 1992
 Allodia anglofennica Edwards, 1921
 Allodia angustilobata Zaitzev, 1984
 Allodia antennata Harrison, 1964
 Allodia auriculatum Edwards, 1925

References

Mycetophilidae